Lepiderema is a genus of nine species of trees from the family Sapindaceae.  botanists know of seven species growing naturally in Australia and two species in New Guinea. Published botanical science provides a limited knowledge of the full range of diversity in Australia and especially in New Guinea. In New Guinea the two known species have descriptions based each on only a single type specimen collection. Therefore, collection of more specimens and more species is most likely in New Guinea. In Australia they grow in rainforests of the northern half of the east coast side of the Great Dividing Range, from northeastern New South Wales through to northeastern Queensland.

In Australia, some species share the name tuckeroo with the closely related genus Cupaniopsis.

The northeastern NSW and southeastern Queensland endemic species L. pulchella has obtained the conservation status of "vulnerable" species by both the Qld and NSW governments.

Two of the northeastern Queensland endemic species L. hirsuta and L. largiflorens have the Queensland government conservation status of "near threatened" species.

Species
This listing was sourced from the Australian Plant Name Index and Australian Plant Census, Flora Malesiana, and Sally T. Reynold's scientific publications.
 Lepiderema hirsuta , Noah's tamarind – Restricted endemic to the Wet Tropics, of NE Queensland
 Lepiderema ixiocarpa , Sticky lepiderema – Endemic to the Wet Tropics, of NE Queensland
 Lepiderema largiflorens  – Endemic to the Bellenden Ker Range, Wet Tropics, of NE Queensland
 Lepiderema melanorrhachis  – Endemic to New Guinea
 Lepiderema papuana  – Endemic to New Guinea
 Lepiderema pulchella , Fine–leaved tuckeroo – Rare, endemic to riverine rainforests of NE New South Wales and SE Queensland
 Lepiderema punctulata  – Endemic to forests of the central coast region of Queensland
 Lepiderema sericolignis , Silkwood – Endemic to the Wet Tropics, of NE Queensland

Species provisionally named, described and accepted according to the authoritative Australian Plant Name Index  while awaiting formal publication
 Lepiderema sp. Impulse Creek (A.B.Pollock 73) Qld Herbarium – central coast region, Queensland, endemic

References

Cited works

External links
 
 L. pulchella NSW vulnerable species listing
 Lepiderema photographs in Flickr

Flora of New Guinea
Flora of Papua New Guinea
Flora of New South Wales
Flora of Queensland
Sapindales of Australia
Sapindaceae genera
Sapindaceae